This is a list of fictional characters from the Japanese anime television series, Fafner in the Azure.

Main characters 
 
 Voiced by: Makoto Ishii (Japanese), Johnny Yong Bosch (English, TV series), Micah Solusod (English, Heaven and Earth)

 Kazuki is very quiet which makes it seem like he has a cold personality, but he is in fact a very kind and sincere character. He has a fear of hurting those around him, which causes him to distance himself from everybody—even his friends.

 Like most of the children on Tatsumiya Island, he had no idea the Earth was under invasion and strives throughout the series to understand why the adults hid this from him, and especially, why his estranged childhood friend Sōshi is so willing to do whatever it takes to defend this humble island. Naturally, to someone with such a gentle nature, having to fight for his life constantly is a bewildering experience that causes him to question who he is and what he believes in, but he really grows as a person over the course of the story and becomes everything a real and uncliched hero ought to be.

 Kazuki is originally the pilot of the Mark Elf (XI), but is given the much more powerful Salvator-Type Fafner, the Mark Sein, later in the series. His mother, Akane, was assimilated by Festum long ago and he now lives with his father Fumihiko who he gets along with very well. He enjoys getting to know Sōshi outside of battle again, and feels comforted when he's with Maya. Living with only his father, he does all the cooking and shopping and thus is an excellent chef. He also seems to be very bad at card games (he's too honest to be good at bluffing).

 
 Voiced by: Kōhei Kiyasu (Japanese), Steve Staley (English, TV series), Josh Grelle (English, Heaven and Earth)

 Sōshi is basically the only one of the children on Tatsumiya Island who knows the truth—the world has been under invasion by an alien race called the Festum for the past three decades and Japan was destroyed 28 years ago. He is the son of Kōzō Minashiro, the commander of the secret military fortress ALVIS, which is hidden in the bowels of the peaceful-seeming Tatsumiya Island. From a very young age, Sōshi was bred to become the next commander of ALVIS, so he has had a very isolated childhood carrying the heavy secret of the war and being told day in and day out that he must live only to protect the island. Though he was very close friends with Kazuki as children, due to an incident in which Kazuki ended up blinding Sōshi's left eye, they have drifted apart, but find themselves once again clinging tight to each other for support when the Festum attack Tatsumiya and it is up to the two of them to defend it.

 Because of his incomplete vision, Sōshi cannot pilot a Fafner and fight the Festum hand-to-hand. Instead, he acts as the battle commander who connects directly into the minds of all the Fafner pilots through a super computer called the Siegfried System, and directs them in battle. All the pilots, especially Kazuki, hold to him for strength and leadership—a burden that he shoulders with grace and stoicism.

 Because of his years of virtual isolation, he is rather awkward socially, (in fact, most people find him quite unapproachable or mistakenly think him hard-hearted). Kazuki alone seems to make efforts to understand and befriend him and the two become very close over the course of the series. Sōshi also has a little sister named Tsubaki who is the island's Core and powers all the computer systems on it. He later pilots Mark Nicht, another Salvator-Type Fafner which like Mark Sein is born from power of nothingness of Tatsumiya Island's Mir.

 
 Voiced by: Marika Matsumoto (Japanese), Stephanie Sheh (English, TV series and Heaven and Earth)

 Maya is a childhood friend of both Kazuki and Sōshi. She is a very lively girl who enjoys rock climbing. She is very frank about everything she says which gives her an air of reliability... but when it comes to romance she has a long way to go.

 Her mother, Chizuru, is the only doctor on the whole of Tatsumiya Island. She also has an older sister named Yumiko who works as a teacher for the handicapped. Although her family works a lot in the medical field, Maya herself has never had much skill in the field... In fact, she even has trouble applying a bandage when needed.

 Maya is an amazing mix of compassion, genuine sweetness, and steel. She has a surprising inner strength as we see in how calmly she thinks under pressure, her willingness to defy authority when she feels it is in the wrong, and her selfless courage in defending her loved ones no matter the situation. She is also extremely observant and sees much more deeply into other people's feelings than they are often willing to show. Her sweet nature translates into an impressive battle persona of icy-calmness. She is the best sniper of the Fafner pilots and eventually becomes the pilot of Mark Sieben (VII). After being captured by the Neo UN, she becomes a test pilot of the Mark Raison. Later, she manage to escape and kills Billy's brother, Dustin, for killing Hiroto.

 
 

 Canon enters the series in episode 11 along with Michio. The two are the ace Fafner pilots of the Neo United Nations' Human Army. She is an excellent and seasoned warrior despite her youth—a result of the war-torn life she has led. She is originally from Dublin, Ireland, which was completely annihilated four years prior to the series. All her family slaughtered, she is taken in by Hino Michio, a Human Army soldier, who teaches her the ways of the soldier. Hardened by a lifetime of fighting, she now simply exists and follows orders, unable to act, decide, desire or do anything of her own will.

 When she arrives on Tatsumiya Island, she is at first offended and then confused by the peaceful world she encounters there. Over time, though, she begins to understand and accept peace and wants desperately to belong there. She becomes friends with Sakura and the other pilots and seems to develop some deeper interest in Kazuki. She is assigned to live with Yōko Hazama, whom she slowly opens up to. She represents the hope that mankind, despite having lived in a non-stop war for the past 30 years, can remember and return to a life of peace. In the events of Exodus, she gains the power to see the future, however she used it through an extent that it used up her life. Before she disappears, she used up her knowledge on her visions on changing the future on developing a new Fafner Model: the Eiherjar-Model and solving the assimilation phenomenon before she fades into the light.

 Canon pilots the Babalon Fafner (which is not a Nothung model like those on Tatsumiya Island), later temporarily pilot the Mark Drei (III) and pilots the Mark Dreizehn (XIII).

Fafner Pilots of Tatsumiya Island 
Fafners are giant humanoid war machines developed by mankind to combat the Festum invasion. Depending on the potential of the pilot, which can be looked through their Synergetic Code profile, they are capable of exhibiting immense power. The more closer their Synergetic Code to the golden ratio, the more potential they are as the pilot of Fafner. In the sequel Exodus, they even develop their latest abilities called SDP (Super Dimensional Power) after the new core of the island awakens. The name FAFNER refers to the character Fáfnir from Norse mythology who turned into a dragon to protect its treasure.

Fafner pilots of Tatsumiya Island contain part of Festum's element within their bodies, which is an important thing in order to move the Fafner. Through Nibelung System, the pilot is able to synchronize with Fafner. Unfortunately, they will also experience the side-effect called assimilation phenomenon when piloting the Fafner and ultimately take on their own lives when the final sign of assimilation phenomenon occurs to them. As the series progress, there are some ways to hold and reverse the effect of assimilation phenomenon and a cure is also yet to be found.

 
 

 Pilot of the Mark Sechs (VI) in the original series.

 Maya's close friend. Plagued with physical weakness from birth, she is often absent from school. She never leaves home without her straw hat. She longs for Kazuki, and although this is known to Maya, Shōko has yet to muster the courage to tell Kazuki himself. Knowing that her fate is piloting Fafner despite her condition, she willingly boards the Mark Sechs alone to defeat the enemy and ultimately sacrifices herself to protect Tatsumiya Island.

 In the sequel Exodus, Shōko briefly reappears along with the deceased residents of Tatsumiya Island in Keel Block, where Gordius Crystals grow and later with Canon in Kazuki's restaurant in front of kyuou.

 
 Voiced by: Miyu Irino (Japanese), Yuri Lowenthal  (English)

 Pilot of the Mark Vier (IV) in the original series, later in the sequel Heaven and Earth and Exodus.

 A gentle boy, well-liked by everyone, has feelings for Shōko that he's unable to express. Kōyō turned into a Festum after being assimilated in the first series, but later chooses to fight alongside Tatsumiya Island and appears to protect the island when in danger as seen in the sequel Heaven and Earth and Exodus.

 
 Voiced by: Satomi Arai (Japanese), Julie Ann Taylor (English, TV series), Leah Clark (English, Heaven and Earth)

 Pilot of the Mark Drei (III) in the original series, later in the sequel Heaven and Earth and Exodus.

 Sakura is the only daughter born into the family that runs the Kaname Dojo on Tatsumiya Island. Her mother, Kiyomi, is a P.E teacher, and her father Seiichirō was a powerful martial artist who was killed in the first assault of the Festum - much to Sakura's dismay. She now fights against the Festum to continue what her father left behind him. As the series progress, she falls in love with Kenji and ultimately accepts his marriage proposal to her. She also changes her surname into Sakura Kondō (近藤 咲良, lit. Kondō Sakura).

 In the sequel Exodus, her SDP ability is able to summon and command Fafner Trooper type from Mark Drei by using Sleipnir System. However, it affects her body temperature as the side-effect of using her SDP ability.

 
 Voiced by: Minoru Shiraishi (Japanese), Lex Lang (English, TV series), Austin Tindle (English, Heaven and Earth)

 Pilot of the Mark Acht (VIII) in the original series, later in the sequel Heaven and Earth and Exodus.

 Kenji is a good-looking young man who doesn't try to hide who he is - in his opinion school exists for the girls, not the studies. He sees Kazuki as his rival, but Kazuki does not see him in the same way. Even so, Kenji often challenges Kazuki to various things but is beaten more often than not. As the series progress, he becomes a responsible person, assuring to protect everyone, especially Sakura. He eventually proposes and marries her.

 In the sequel Exodus, his SDP ability is able to regenerate the lost or destroyed parts of Fafner when in the battle. He also temporarily replaces Soshi's position in controlling Siegfried System when he leaves Tatsumiya Island.

 
 Voiced by: Mitsuki Saiga (Japanese), Tony Oliver (English)

 Pilot of the Mark Fünf (V) in the original series.

 An energetic boy who is obsessed with the manga "Mobile Samurai Goubain". During battle, he sorties wearing a Goubain toy helmet. While wearing it, his fears are subsided and his confidence is boosted, allowing him to fight like a manga hero. This helmet is passed on to Hiroto Dōma and later Mimika Mikagami. He died when fighting the Festum to protect the island.

 In the sequel Exodus, Mamoru briefly reappears along with the deceased residents of Tatsumiya Island in Keel Block, where Gordius Crystals grow.

 
 Voiced by: Nozomu Sasaki (Japanese), Sam Riegel (English, TV series), Chris Burnett (English, Heaven and Earth)

 Pilot of the Mark Fünf (V) in the sequel Heaven and Earth and Exodus.

 A confident, easy-going but generous and wise person, he serves as an idol and announcer of Tatsumiya Island. He usually goes along with Seri, where he seems has a crush on her.

 In the sequel Exodus, Hiroto is shot down and killed by Dustin Morgan. His Mark Fünf is later captured by Neo U.N which is then used as a basis of the new Salvator model, Mark Raison. Since he leaves Tatsumiya Island, he doesn't develop his SDP ability. His remains manage to be retrieved by Kyōsuke Mizoguchi as he escapes with Maya.

 
 Voiced by: Misato Fukuen (Japanese), Megan Hollingshead (English, TV series), Jad Saxton (English, Heaven and Earth)

 Pilot of the Mark Zwölf (XII) in the sequel Heaven and Earth and Exodus.

 She is gentle and quiet, but otherwise caring person. When not on her duty, she spends her time to go to the mountain to catch the bugs. Seri develops emotional bond with the island's core, Tsubaki and Orihime Minashiro.

 In the sequel Exodus, her SDP ability is assimilating nearby objects around her by touching them.
 
 
 Voiced by: Ryoko Shiraishi (Japanese), Mela Lee (English, TV series), Jamie Marchi (English, Heaven and Earth)

 Pilot of the Mark Neun (IX) and Zero Fafner in the sequel Heaven and Earth and Exodus.

 Akira's twin sister. Rina is energetic and confident, but somewhat emotional person. She greatly admires Maya and actively seeks the chance to be praised by her. She also has a crush on Kenji and is a bit shocked hearing that Kenji and Sakura will be marry.

 In the sequel Exodus, her SDP ability is boosting the power of Fafner armaments, though it will leaves her in a lethargic state shortly after.

 
 

 Pilot of the Mark Zehn (X) and Zero Fafner in the sequel Heaven and Earth and Exodus.  Rina's twin brother. In contrast with his twin sister, Akira is calm and gentle but somewhat can be impulsive too. He desires to become as strong as Kazuki so that he can protect the others. Akira also has a crush on Maya. Since he leaves Tatsumiya Island, he doesn't yet develop his own SDP ability. He was then assimilated after protecting the Third Alvis from the Festum.

 
 

 Pilot of the Mark Vierzehn (XIV), which is also dubbed as Susanoo in the sequel Exodus. Reo is the oldest trio of the third-generation Fafner pilot of Tatsumiya Island and skillful in sword-art and making pastry. He has a crush on Mimika, although she is yet to be aware of his feeling. In the sequel Exodus, his SDP ability is teleportation from one to the other place, creating dimensional portal. As the effect of using his SDP ability, it also creates dimensional hole on his body.

 
 

 Pilot of the Mark Fünfzehn (XV), which is also dubbed as Tsukuyomi in the sequel Exodus.  Sweet and cheerful person, Mimika excels at sports. Her physical stamina is also above the average which make her best-suited to pilot Tsukuyomi. She idolizes Hiroto Dōma and enjoys reading Mobile Samurai Goubain manga while in her spend time. Ultimately, Hiroto passes his Goubain helmet to her before he leaves the island. In the sequel Exodus, her SDP ability is able to create the barrier to hold on the enemies, though it will also form the black spheres on parts of her body and ultimately, her whole body, as the effect of using her SDP ability. It is shown when she pilots her Fafner to her limit when shielding the island from the Festums, making her whole body is assimilated and changed into the black sphere. However, her soul and her mind still retain within. Later on, she regained her body back after Kazuki saved everyone from the Festum during the battle in the Third Alvis.

 
 

 Pilot of the Mark Sechszehn (XVI), which is also dubbed as Amaterasu in the sequel Exodus.  A clever teenage boy who has a crush on Rina. He has a sister named Sanae Kaburagi who was the pilot of Fafner Titan Model and died while participating in the L-Plan as seen in the prequel Right of Left. Sui has a strained relationship with his mother since his sister died. He rarely speaks up his mind firmly but as the series progress, find the strength to do so and finally reconciles with his mother. In the sequel Exodus, his SDP ability is summoning nearby objects or persons around him, though he cannot summoning back the deceased one. His weight also increases as the effect of using his SDP ability.

ALVIS 
ALVIS is not only the name of the Fafner-operational submarine fortress, but also the name of the organization of the people who work there. It is not simply a warship: many different facilities exist inside. CDC is the command room. The island's core sleeps in the Cave of the Valkyrie. Solomon is held in the Keel Block. Fafner is stored in Burg. In addition to these, it provides every other essential facility, from a medical ward to a cleaners. Later revealed in Exodus that there are at least three known Alvis-class ships in the world created as a part of Arcadian Project. However two of these survived.

 
 Voiced by: Masahiko Tanaka (Japanese), Kirk Thornton (English, TV series), Brian Mathis (English, Heaven and Earth)

 Kazuki's father and commander of ALVIS after Kōzō Minashiro's death. He owns a ceramic store and learned how to make them from his wife, Akane Makabe.

 
 

 Sōshi's father. The previous commander of ALVIS and headmaster of the school on Tatsumiya Island.

 
 Voiced by: Emi Shinohara (Japanese), Kate Higgins (English, TV series), Luci Christian (English, Heaven and Earth)

 The doctor on the whole of Tatsumiya Island and Maya's mother.

 
 Voiced by: Yukana (Japanese), Michelle Ruff (English, TV series), Cynthia Cranz (English, Heaven and Earth)

 Maya's older sister. A teacher for the handicapped when not working as an ALVIS operator. She marries Michio Hino and has a natural-born daughter named Miwa Hino.

 
 Voiced by: Nanaho Katsuragi (Japanese), Jane Alan (English, TV series), Lydia Mackay (English, Heaven and Earth)

 Shōko's mother by adoption, and later in the series, Canon's. She works as a technician and mechanical engineer in ALVIS. Also owns a dog named Chocolat after being delivered by Kōyō and a cat named Kuu.

 
 Voiced by: Shizuka Ishikawa (Japanese), June Ellis (English, TV series), Colleen Clinkenbeard (English, Heaven and Earth)

 Sakura's mother. A P.E teacher when not working as a CDC operator of ALVIS. Her husband died in the first assault of the Festum.

 
 

 Sakura's father. A powerful martial artist. He was killed in the first assault of the Festum.

 
 

 Kenji's mother. A school maths teacher when not working as an ALVIS operator. She died when Festum attacked the ALVIS in the original series.

 
 

 Mamoru's mother. She died when Festum attacked the ALVIS in the original series.

 
 Voiced by: Akimitsu Takase (Japanese), Kim Strauss (English, TV series), Chuck Huber (English, Heaven and Earth)

 Mamoru's father. Head Mechanic of ALVIS. He also works as an author and publishes serial manga called "Mobile Samurai Goubain", whom Mamoru initially unaware that the manga he enjoyed reading is actually created by his own father.

 
 Voiced by: Takaya Hashi (Japanese), John Smallberries (English, TV series), Chris Rager (English, Heaven and Earth)

 Leader of the squad of ALVIS. An easy-going, humorous, and yet responsible and reliable person and also an experienced fighter, Kyōsuke often serves as an advisor to Maya, teaching her how to fight and use the weapons when in the battle.

 
 Voiced by: Hisako Kyoda (Japanese), June Ellis (English, TV series), Juli Erickson (English, Heaven and Earth)

 Akira and Rina's grandmother. The professor of the ALVIS, she once developed the prototype Aegil-model, called Zero Fafner. However, during its first test, her daughter and her son-in-law was assimilated in. Shocked after, she retired from her works, though still giving advice to the young personnel of the ALVIS. Currently, she runs the grocery store and is taking care of her grandchildren. She also the first person who aware of the appearance of the Gordius Crystals in Keel Block.

 
 

 A former member of the Neo U.N. who defects to Tatsumiya Island and becomes an ALVIS operator.

 
 

 A former member of the Neo U.N. who defects to Tatsumiya Island and becomes part of the Fafner mechanic team.

 
 

 A former member and Fafner pilot of the Neo U.N. who defects to Tatsumiya Island. She serves as a CDC operator of ALVIS. Olga dies when her plane is attacked by Festum while en route to Tatsumiya Island. Later briefly reappears alongside the deceased residents in Keel Block.

 
 

 A former member and Fafner pilot of the Neo U.N. who defects to Tatsumiya Island. She serves as a CDC operator of ALVIS.

 
 

 A former member and Fafner pilot of the Neo U.N. who defects to Tatsumiya Island. She serves as a CDC operator of ALVIS.

 
 

 The next to inherit Mizoguchi's squad. It is hinted that he's in a relationship with Mai as her father suggests that they should get married already.

 
 

 Ryō's aunt. An information officer in Mizoguchi's squad. Later replaces Kaname's position as a CDC operator of ALVIS.

 
 

 Hiroto's older sister. Nickname "Don't Mind Mai" as it is her trademark quote. She temporarily stands in for Olga as a CDC operator when the latter leaves for the expedition in the sequel Exodus.

 
 

 Hiroto and Mai's father. He owns a restaurant on Tatsumiya Island.

 
 

 Reo's father. His wife is from Belgium, making his son half Japanese and half Belgian. Currently owns a cake store. He is also skillful in sword-art.

 
 

 Mimika's mother. She works as a fisherman and runs a boat house on Tatsumiya Island. She loves her daughter very much and is shocked when hearing that Mimika is selected as the pilot of Fafner, although she later supports her daughter.

 
 

 Sui's mother. Since the death of her daughter, Sanae Kaburagi, Kanae suffers from guilt and pays little attention to her son. She even proposes a second L-Plan in hope to reunite with her deceased daughter. Realizing that Sui is also fond of Sanae and her actions will only make her daughter sad, Kanae finally reconciles with him and decides to abandon the second L-Plan proposal. She owns a beauty salon on Tatsumiya Island.

 
 

 Sui's father. He works as a policeman on Tatsumiya Island and also a fighter-plane pilot of ALVIS. His daughter's death also crushes him greatly, but he does his best to help with the reconciliation between his wife and son and is overwhelmed with joy when his family finally reunites once more.

 
 

 Seri's father. He runs a shrine on Tatsumiya Island, where Seri also helps him with the ceremonies.

 
 

 Seri's mother. She works as a fashion designer and once makes a dress for Orihime Minashiro.

Neo U.N. 
Neo United Nations. Their military force is generally referred as the Human Army.
 
 
 Secretary-General of the Neo United Nations, who wishes the total eradication of the Festum. However in Exodus, it's revealed that she has the Mir recovered from the Third Alvis.

 
 
 A young man who joins the Human Army along with his father. He participates in the Neo United Nations Tatsumiya Island occupation mission, but after discovering their plan to blow up the island, ends up saving it. Returning to his homeland, he confesses his love to Yumiko Tōmi and they are married. He's killed shortly before the birth of his daughter.

 
 
 Maya's father. He harbors a deep hatred towards Festum and desires to wipe them out of the earth. To fulfill his goal, he is willing to do anything and even abandoning his own family by leaving Tatsumiya Island and joining Neo UN Army. He develops the second Salvator-Model Fafner called Mark Nicht, although it is later stolen by Idun.

 
 

 
 
 Michio's father. A scientist working for the Neo U.N. in order to develop the new Salvator-model that is Mark Sein. When the Human Army's base is raided by Festum, he gives it to Kazuki at the cost of his life.

 
 
 A high rank general of the Neo U.N. as well as the oldest Fafner pilot in history. He claims to being kept alive by the Festum, just like Sōshi.

 
 
 Leader of the Perseus Company of the Human Army. He is introduced as Mitsuhiro's son and Maya's half-brother, but later revealed to be a clone puppet created by Mitsuhiro Bartland and a vessel for the Neo U.N.'s Mir. Immediately after this turn of events, his memories get erased. He's about to be disposed of when his body resonates with the Mir, becoming a Master-type Festum. Later, he pilots the Mark Raison after Maya escapes.

 
 
 Member of the Perseus Company of the Human Army. He's genuinely an upbeat, happy-go-lucky guy but also has a passion to fight like his brother, Dustin.

 
 
 Member of the Perseus Company of the Human Army. She greatly admires Kazuki because thanks to his brief involvement with the Human Army, they are able to develop the "Makabe Factor" that gives many soldiers the ability to pilot Fafner, including her.

 
 
 Billy's older brother. Leader of the Argos Platoon of the Human Army. He is killed by Maya while she escapes from Neo UN.

 
 
 Member of the Argos Platoon of the Human Army.

Festum 
The Mir are those who create Festum. The relationship between Mir and Festum is like that of God and man. The Festum do not have individual will. The will of the Mir is their will. Therefore, they call themselves "we". Festum that show emotions, like Misao Kurusu, are perceived by the Mir as "defects".
 
 Voiced by: Megumi Toyoguchi (Japanese), Lynn Fischer (English, TV series), Jennifer Seman (English, Heaven and Earth)

 
 

 
 Voiced by: Ryōhei Kimura (Japanese), Joel McDonald (English)

 A Sphinx-type Festum given human form. When first introduced in the sequel movie Heaven and Earth, Misao claims to have been sent by Sōshi to come in contact with Tatsumiya Island to help them find peace between humans and Festum. A rare Festum with a conscious and a wise but childlike nature, he protect Sōshi's existence and strongly desires to be able to understand the world Sōshi lives in. After he learns about the suffering of the people on the island through Kazuki, he sacrifices his life as a shield against a Human Army's bombing attack, saving both the Festum and the island. In the sequel Exodus, He is reincarnated as a Core-type Festum, but still retains his previous memories and personality.

Characters in Right of Left 
The L-Plan in Right of Left involves detaching the left wing (L-Boat) of ALVIS and having it cruise around for a period of time without optical camouflage as a diversion. This is used to distract the Festum and the Neo United Nations from Tatsumiya Island. The plan also calls for 4 Titan-model units to act as escorts. 
 
 

 One-year senior to Kazuki's class, Ryō Masaoka participates in the L-Plan as a Fafner pilot. Prior to his involvement in the L-Plan, Ryō is diagnosed with a hereditary disease that gives him an extremely weak constitution. He's able to experience the joy of running for the first time riding in the Fafner unit. He also has an aunt, Saki Masaoka, who is an information officer in Mizoguchi's squad.

 In Exodus, Ryō briefly appears along with the deceased residents of Tatsumiya Island in Keel Block, where Gordius Crystals grow.

 
 

 Ryō's childhood friend. After the loss of her mother, she cares for her bedridden father. After her father's death, she becomes aware of the existence of ALVIS and the L-Plan.

 In Exodus, Yumi briefly appears along with the deceased residents of Tatsumiya Island in Keel Block, where Gordius Crystals grow.

 
 

 Because she's adopted by the Minashiro family at a young age, Karin has known since childhood of the real situation on Earth. She's also part of the L-Plan, but not in a combat role. On the first day of the Festum invasion of Tatsumiya Island, she's killed on her way to the Burg Fafner storage facility. She has a crush on her one-year senior Ryō Masaoka.

 In Exodus, Karin briefly appears along with the deceased residents of Tatsumiya Island in Keel Block, where Gordius Crystals grow.

Other Characters 
 
 Voiced by: Tamaki Nakanishi (Japanese), Mela Lee (English, TV series), Kristi Kang (English, Heaven and Earth)
 Tatsumiya Island's former Core and Sōshi's younger sister. She was born as a core shortly after her mother, Saya Minashiro, was assimilated during the experiment. She teaches Mir what is the meaning of life and death and later sacrifices herself to merge with the newborn core of Tatsumiya Island.

 
 
 Michio and Yumiko's daughter. She is the first child born on Tatsumiya Island by natural conception. Miwa is able to communicate and understand Mir language.

 
 
 One of the Esperantos who can communicate and understand Mir language, just like Miwa. Her family was assimilated during a Festum assault on her homeland. She always holds onto her younger brother's shoe which has a Mir's crystal in it. She is rescued by Narain after the Neo U.N. declare ROE Alpha and wipe out both the Festum and citizens of Human Army's Hawaii-Poliahu transport base.

 
 
 The current Core of Tatsumiya Island and biologically Sōshi's nephew. Although she is a reincarnation of the previous core, sharing similarity in physical appearance, Orihime has different personalities compared to Tsubaki's. She can be decisive and serious, but also caring to the others, albeit a little bit too blunt. Her name is given by Seri, after the Vega star and the Tanabata festival.

Terminology 
This is a list of some of the key terms frequently used in the series.

Fafner Types 
 Fafner Einherjar Model - A next generation frame developed by Canon Hazama after using her SDP ability to change the future, thought she died in the process when its plans are completed. Its overall design and function is to reduce the Assimilation Phenomenon the pilots bears while overall enhancing their SDP abilities, which allows the pilot to fight for longer periods. Only a few units were converted to this model in preparation for Altair's arrival during Operation Fourth Azure.
 Fafner Trooper Type - Unmanned limited-production Fafners based on Mark Dreizehn created and fielded by ALVIS. Seen in Exodus. In combat, they are controlled from the Mark Drei using Sleipnir System.
 Fafner Mark Sechszehn Amaterasu (XVI) - Third generation Nothung-model, or technically Second Stage (SS) Fafner based on Mark Sechs. Seen in Exodus. Able to summon nearby objects (such as armaments and later core) after receiving a new power. Later converted into an Einherjar-Model. It is piloted by Sui Kaburagi.
 Fafner Mark Fünfzehn Tsukuyomi (XV) - Third generation Nothung-model, or technically Second Stage (SS) Fafner based on Mark Fünf piloted by Mimika Mikagami. Seen in Exodus. Just like Mark Fünf, it's equipped with Aegis Shield and also can be used to slash the enemies once activated. It also gains the ability to create barrier after receiving new power. Later converted into an Einherjar-Model.
 Fafner Mark Vierzehn Susanoo (XIV) - Third generation Nothung-model, or technically Second Stage (SS) Fafner based on Mark Elf. Seen in Exodus. After received new power, it has teleportation ability, just like Mark Sein and Mark Nicht. Later converted into an Einherjar-Model. It is piloted by Reo Mikado.
 Fafner Mark Dreizehn (XIII) - Second-generation Nothung-model Fafner. Seen in Heaven and Earth and Exodus. It is piloted by Canon Hazama. In Exodus, it displays the ability to predict the actions of the enemy a short period of time in advance, and moves with speed that rivals that of Mark Sein. After Canon's death, Misao Kurusu becomes its temporary pilot.
 Fafner Mark Zwölf (XII) - Second-generation Nothung-model Fafner. Seen in Heaven and Earth and Exodus. Capable to attack the enemies by its head, butting them. Able to assimilate the enemies after receiving new power. Later converted into an Einherjar-Model. It is piloted by Seri Tatekami.
 Fafner Mark Elf (XI) - First-generation Nothung-model Fafner. Kazuki's boarding machine. Capable of atmospheric flight to a certain extent. Its core later implanted into Mark Sein when it was captured by the Neo UN. In Exodus, it is used as the basis model of Mark Vierzehn Susanoo (XIV).
 Fafner Mark Zehn (X) - Second-generation Nothung model-Fafner. Seen in Heaven and Earth and Exodus. It is piloted by Akira Nishio. Like Mark Sieben, it is equipped with Dragon Tooth.
 Fafner Mark Neun (IX) - Second-generation Nothung-model Fafner. Seen in the movie and Exodus. Later converted into an Einherjar-Model. It is piloted by Rina Nishio. Its power boosts rapidly after receiving the new power.
 Fafner Mark Acht (VIII) - First-generation Nothung-model Fafner. Later converted into an Einherjar-Model in Exodus. Relatively basic Fafner used by Kenji Kondō. After receiving new power, Mark Acht is able to regenerate parts of Fafner which was destroyed or lost when in the battle.
 Fafner Mark Sieben (VII) - First-generation Nothung-model Fafner. Flight-capable Fafner based around the Mark Sechs. Equipped with Dragon Tooth to fire enemies at distant range. Later converted into an Einherjar-Model. It is piloted by Maya Tōmi.
 Fafner Mark Sechs (VI) - First-generation Nothung-model Fafner. Flight-capable in atmosphere. Used very briefly by Shōko in Episode 6 when she used it to destroy a Festum by activating self-destruct Fenrir System. In Exodus, it is used as the basis model of Mark Sechszehn Amaterasu (XVI).
 Fafner Mark Fünf (V) - First-generation Nothung-model Fafner. Defense-use Fafner equipped with the Aegis Shield. Used by Mamoru Kōdate in the TV-series and later piloted by Hiroto Dōma in Heaven and Earth and Exodus. In Exodus, it is used as the basis model of Mark Fünfzehn Tsukuyomi (XV).
 Fafner Mark Vier (IV) - First-generation Nothung-model Fafner. Heavy assault unit briefly used by Kōyō Kasugai in the original series. Its core later implanted into Mark Nicht. In Heaven and Earth and Exodus, it is repiloted by Kōyō Kasugai. Using Festum power, Mark Vier is capable to withstand and defeat the enemies alone even against Azazel-Type Festum such as Walker.
 Fafner Mark Drei (III) - First-generation Nothung-model Fafner. Specialized Fafner used by Sakura Kaname. Can charge energy into its right hand to use the "Energy Knuckle" attack. Later temporarily piloted by Canon Memphis-Hazama and repiloted by Sakura Kaname in Heaven and Earth. Also piloted by Sakura in Exodus, where it is used as a command unit for unmanned Trooper type Fafners using Sleipnir System. Gains the ability to replicate destroyed Trooper types when they are destroyed, though the replica disappear after the end of battle.
 Fafner Thrones model - One of new mass-production Fafner models developed by Perseus Company of Neo UN. Appears in Exodus which one of the unit is piloted by Aishwaria 'Ai' Fain.
 Fafner Dominions model - One of new mass-production Fafner models developed by Perseus Company of Neo UN. Appears in Exodus which one of the unit is piloted by Jonathan Mitsuhiro Bartland.
 Fafner Powers model - One of new mass-production Fafner models developed by Perseus Company of Neo UN. Appears in Exodus which one of the unit is piloted by Billy Morgan.
 Fafner Mega Therion model - Michio's Fafner, which is very different from the Nothung models made by Tatsumiya. This model is made by the Neo UN. Later destroyed after the battle with Festum.
 Fafner Babalon model - Canon's Fafner, which is very different from the Nothung models made by Tatsumiya. This model is made by the Neo UN. Later destroyed after the battle with Festum.
 Fafner Gnosis model - The mass-production Fafner models made by the Neo UN. Their reliability is questionable. Their armaments consist of a right-arm Machine gun and a left-arm beam cannon, which, as seen in the anime, are mostly useless against even the most common Sphinx-type Festums. It is briefly used by Kazuki Makabe when he was trying to escape from the Neo UN base after Festum's attack in the TV-series.
 Fafner ? model - A second mass-production Fafner of the Neo UN seen during Operation Heaven's Door which is capable of flight. Might be Mega Therion units.
 Fafner Mark Sein ('Existence') - The First Salvator-model Fafner created the Neo UN. Initially supposed to be piloted by Michio Hino, it became Kazuki's second boarding machine, delivered to him by a Festum in Master Form (Festums that take on human appearance) after Mark Elf was captured by the Neo UN and its core implanted into Mark Sein. The Festum in question is called Mjölnir and is the Festum his mother Akane Makabe merged with, thus having her looks. This unit changed form and abilities drastically after melting inside a Festum, which among other things made it pilotable only by Kazuki. It has an ability to enhance normal weaponry by using it. In Exodus, Mark Sein has gained the power to negate and even reverse some cases of assimilation.
 Fafner Mark Nicht ('Nothingness') - The Second Salvator-model Fafner created by the Neo UN. It is a black version of the Mark Sein's original form using the core of the sunken remnants of the Mark Vier. It was intended to be piloted by Yukie Kariya during Operation Heaven's Door, but it was stolen by the Master Festum Idun. It shares abilities from both Mark Sein and the Festum. Later piloted by Misao Kurusu in Heaven and Earth and by Sōshi Minashiro in Exodus. The form of Mark Nicht appearing in the movie and Exodus is more organic in appearance than it was originally, similar to Mark Sein's transformation in the series. It also appears more demonic and sinister in appearance. In Exodus, while Mark Sein can assimilate weapons to increase their power and revert assimilation, Nicht has the power to assimilate its Festum targets and then use the unique abilities of those targets. Mark Nicht is occasionally referred to in Exodus as the "Child of Nothingness" (虚無の子, Kyomu no Ko).
 Fafner Mark Raison ('Reason') - The Third Salvator-model based on the Mark Fünf developed by Neo UN as mentioned in Exodus. It was assigned to Maya Tōmi after being captured by the Neo UN, after she escapes, Jonathan Mitsuhiro Bartland becomes the new pilot. It can link with the Azazel-Type Festum Vagrant, currently used as the Neo UN's surveillance Satellite and can assimilate enemies using light. The Raison can also control and manipulate the assimilated Festum through its link to the pilot and Mir. It also can create a powerful barrier similar that to the Aegis Shield, boosting one of the most powerful defense of all Salvator-type Fafners.
 Fafner Titan Model (TSX) - Seen in Right of Left piloted by Ryō, Yumi, and their classmates, it appears to be a pre-production model Fafner. At least four were produced. The Assimilation Phenomenon also appears to be accelerated when using the Titan models. Armaments seems to consist of Arm Machineguns, a prototype version of the Luger Lance simply called Naginata, and a multi-tube Missile launcher.
 Fafner Mark Zwei (II) - Seen in Right of Left. It appears to have been built at the same time as the Mark I as their piloting tests were at the same time and they seem to have virtually identical configurations. This was Karin Kuramae's unit which she tried to board in the first episode. Most of it was used to repair/rebuild Mark Elf after Kazuki's first battle.
 Fafner Mark Eins (I) - This appears to be the first Nothung Model made by Tatsumiya island. It was supposed to be piloted by Sōshi Minashiro (as seen in Right of Left), but apparently he cannot use it because of his scarred eye. It is a basic unit that became Michio's after the destruction of the Mega Therion. It is later destroyed in battle against Mark Nicht, and Michio is killed.
 Zero Fafner - The prototype Fafner model, later referred as Aegil-model Fafner in Heaven and Earth, only mentioned in official background information. Developed by professor Ikumi Nishio. After its initial test phase, some high-ranking members of ALVIS defected to the Neo UN. Zero Fafner is very huge and massive compared with other Fafner models, measuring about 100 m in height. As a Siegfried-system integrated frame, Zero Fafner requires two pilots in order to operate it. Zero Fafner is piloted by Rina and Akira Nishio (initially tested by Rina and Akira's parents, but failed as they were assimilated during the test) as seen in Heaven and Earth. Later will be appeared in Exodus. After Akira got assimilated, Sui Kaburagi takes his place.
Mark I-III+XI apparently share the same body design, as do Mk.VI & VII and IV & VIII, respectively, according to the Memorial Book.

Festum Types 
 Mir Type - The Mir Type, often simply called the "Mir", is the highest theorized evolution of Festum consciousness. In 2085, an unknown photon crystalline body is discovered in a huge crater at the bottom of the Seto Inland Sea. Named the Seto Inland Sea Mir, the photon crystalline body is determined to be an intelligent life form. Presented at the Astrobiological Society conference, it is analyzed under the direct control of the Japanese government. A Mir controls the Festum hivemind, and is constantly assimilating information. Miwa Hino and people called Esperanto (Emery Almond, for example) understand Mir's language and are able to communicate with them.
 Core Type - Serves as the "mediator" between Mir and human. Tsubaki and Orihime Minashiro of Tatsumiya Island and the newly reborn core of the NSSC Bollearios (which Misao Kurusu merged with) are examples of this type. Idun was revealed to either have originally been a Core Type, or was pretending to fill this role, but after awakening, he immediately became a Master Type and within months had evolved into an adult form.
 Sphinx Type - Most common throughout the series; primarily consists of A Types. B Types rarely appear in the series, but serve as the primary Festum in Right of Left. Only one C Type appears early in the series in episodes 5 and 6 and is taken out by a suicide attack from the Mark Sechs. A D Type primarily uses long-ranged weaponry and is the first festum to be killed in the first joint operation by Marks Drei, Fünf, and Acht. Misao Kurusu is an exceptional Sphinx Type Festum who has emotional feelings and wants to live in order to see the beautiful sky.
 Grendel Type - Human sized Festum that resemble fleas.
 Alhenterus Type - Weaker version of standard Sphinx Type.
 Pleiades Type - Asexually reproductive Festum with highly explosive larvae. Exactly 117 newborns can easily destroy a mountain.
 Coagula Type - Festum that only assimilate with no real offensive weapons in the series; later uses bombs in the movie. They can only be killed when their eyes acquire serious damage.
 Scarab Type - Festum that only destroy with no assimilation properties.
 Master Type - The leaders and the most powerful of the Festum, only a select few can differentiate from the hive mind.
 Idun - The most powerful Master Type and the main antagonist of the series. His power at both the destructive and assimilation level is greater than any other festum and can turn into a gigantic Sphinx Type that required the power of Mark Sein to stop. Near the end of the series, he assimilates the Mark Nicht's pilot, Yukie Kariya, and hijacks the Mark Nicht. Idun seemed to have originally been a Core Type of an abandoned island, or perhaps had been pretending such a role to ambush the Tatsujima Island explorers.
 Mjolnir - A Master Type Festum, like Idun. Mjölnir is the Festum that assimilated Kazuki's mother, Akane Makabe. It collaborated with Yōji Hino and was apparently killed shortly after delivering the Mark Sein to Kazuki; however, Mjölnir reappears on Tatsumiya Island during the series finale. In Heaven and Earth, it was revealed that she survived, and later sacrificed her life by merging with the Tatsumiya Island's Mir to ensure its survival.
 Slave Type - Mentioned in the first season. A type with no assimilation ability. So far, Kōyō Kasugai (after he became Festum) is the only known Slave type.
 Eurus Type - Newly evolved Festum in Heaven and Earth. Its body appears in red color. Notable in its ability to mimic and utilize human weapons like the Dragon Tooth.
 Azazel Type - A new type of Festum introduced in Exodus. There are three sub-types of Azazel: Walker, Road Runner and Vagrant. Each of their seen number are unique, and are far larger than most common Festum. They seem to be the current new antagonists, replacing Idun and the North Pole Mir. Their appearance varies; for instance, the Azazel in Srinagar walked on four legs and was destroyed by Sein and Nicht but it managed to transport its core where it either reformed again or was consumed by another possible Azazel Type Festum, whereas the Azazel at Tatsumiya Island stands like a human and possess high intelligence. The last, Vagrant, was used by the Neo UN by providing it with information regarding Tatsumiya Island and their actions, until its Mir rebelled against the humans. It is implied that the Azazel Type are parts of and/or connected to a Mir, possible even the remains of the North Pole Mir, and Sōshi claims that there are many more Azazel Types than the single two seen so far.
 Diablo Type - A new type of Festum introduced in Exodus. They seem to demonic in shape and appearance, close quarter Festum that seem capable of overpowering and defeating mass-produced Fafner singlehandedly, by targeting their cockpits or attach to the pilot by assimilation and can take over the controls of fafner. They form worm spheres which can cut any Fafner.
 Gregory Type - A new type of Festum introduced in Exodus, which is called "ghost" by Jonathan. Gregory is a result of human assimilation with Festum, leaving them dead and reappearing as a ghost, taking humanoid form, such as the boy who appeared in area Srinagar. Although disturbing, it is not dangerous and aggressive like the other types. Later can assimilate its host's mind.
 Leviathan Type - A new class of festum as big as the Tatsumiya Island itself, measuring about 6 kilometers in size. It is capable of swallowing huge enemies whole. Later defeated by Mark Zwolf after assimilating it and by Mark Nicht by destroying it during Operation Fourth Azure.

Weapons 
These are all listed and used in the anime and/or game.
 Aegis Shield - Mounted on protectors either on the shoulders or the back. It is essentially a portable Welle Shield, and is used to block Festum attacks.
 Cluster Bomb
 Dimension Gun - A large cannon/bazooka type weapon capable of inflicting a large amount of inter-dimensional damage. Can only fire one shot. Appears only in the game.
 Dragon Tooth - A high-caliber sniper rifle with a 'tooth' to dig into the ground for stability.
 Durandal - A small sidearm for taking on light targets. Ineffectual against the Festum.
 Electromagnetic Launcher - A railcannon type weapon. It is usually referred to as the "Rail Gun".
 Energy Fist - Used by Mark Drei initially. Concentrating energy into its right hand, the Fafner shoves it through the Festum's core, destroying it.
 Fenrir System - A self-destruct system that is assumed to activate automatically, should the Fafner be assimilated. It creates a miniaturized black hole similar to the Festums upon detonation.
 Fire Drake
 Garm-44 - A semi-automatic rifle with 100 rounds, scaled to Fafner size.
 Gegner - A small energy weapon, used typically against small the Festum.
 Gelatic Bullet
 Lindwurm - The Fafner's carrier-type vehicle. It is guided by the Siegfried System. Its armaments include Missile Pods, Grapple Pods, and a rotating Laser Cannon.
 Loeðingr Cutter - Small wires stored in the Fafner's knuckles that shoot out and envelope enemies. The wires can be charged to cut through materials.
 Long Sword - Mounted in a compartment within the Lindwurm. A solid shaft with a laser-edge running up the blade. Proved to be marginally effective against the Festum.
 Luger Lance - The Fafner's main weapon. Usually used as a sword, but can be expanded to open a gap. Once a gap is made, an energy shot can be launched.
 Medusa - A shoulder mounted energy cannon. Contains considerable power, comparable to that of the Lindwurms Tail Laser Cannon.
 Mine Blade - A short laser-edged knife. The blade is apparently made of nanomachines and can reshape itself, if broken. It bears an uncanny resemblance to the 'progressive knife' of the renowned series Evangelion in both appearance and use.
 Piram - A handheld spike launcher. Once the spike hits the target, it sends an electric charge through the cable to damage or immobilize it.
 Punch - A basic punching attack. Usually aided by a piston to provide more of a kick.
 Salamander - A flamethrower
 Scorpion
 Thermotics Blade

References 

Fafner in the Azure